Halla Group (Hangul: 한라그룹) is a South Korean chaebol that engages in automobile, construction, distribution/port, investment, education, and sports businesses in Korea and internationally. Its construction business comprises the provision of civil, architectural, housing, plant, and environmental works; supply of construction materials, such as remicon, compounds, and pile concrete; and manufacture and distribution of remicon and aggregates.

History
Halla Group was founded as  Hyundai International, Inc. in 1962. The Halla name was first used in 1978 as the name of a cement company. The name Halla is taken from Mount Halla, a mountain on Jeju Island.

Halla collapsed in 1997 during the 1997 Asian Financial Crisis.

In 2008 Halla repurchased Mando, a car company they sold during the financial crisis. The chaebol also sponsors multiple hockey teams, mainly Anyang Halla in the Asia League Ice Hockey and Kiekko-Vantaa in the Finnish Mestis.

References

External links
Halla.com

Chaebol
Conglomerate companies of South Korea
Conglomerate companies established in 1962
South Korean companies established in 1962